Enteromius tetrastigma is a species of ray-finned fish in the genus Enteromius which is endemic to Democratic Republisc of the Congo.

Footnotes 

 

Enteromius
Taxa named by George Albert Boulenger
Fish described in 1913
Endemic fauna of the Democratic Republic of the Congo